COVID-19 vaccination in Sri Lanka is an ongoing immunisation campaign against severe acute respiratory syndrome coronavirus 2 (SARS-CoV-2), the virus that causes COVID-19, in response to the ongoing pandemic in the country. As of late July, the Sinopharm BIBP vaccine accounted for 78% of the total 13.8 million vaccines obtained by Sri Lanka to date. The United States donated over 1.5 million Moderna vaccine through COVAX.

Background 
The Government of Sri Lanka commenced its COVID-19 vaccination program under the COVAX facility with first batch of Oxford–AstraZeneca vaccines arrive in Sri Lanka on 28 January 2021 from the Serum Institute of India. (SII).

Phase one
In the first phase, the government began vaccination of health and front line workers in February 2021.

Phase two
In the second phase, the government began vaccination of persons above the age of 30 in late February 2021 in the Western Province. This was rolled back in early March 2021, to limited to persons above the age of 60. By April, vaccination of persons above the age of 30 has started and extended beyond the Western Province.

Shortages
By April, with a surge in COVID cases in a third wave of infections, Sri Lanka faced a severe shortage of the Astra-Zeneca vaccine due to an export ban by India. This left majority of the 3.5% of the population that was given the first dose without access to the second. Sri Lanka faced an shortage of Sputnik V vaccine due to a spike of cases in Russia resulting in the manufacturer Gamaleya Research Institute of Epidemiology and Microbiology, focusing on meeting local demand.

Other vaccine supplies 
In March 2021, the Sinopharm BIBP vaccine was approved emergency use. In May, the country ordered 14 million doses on top of 1.1 million doses previously donated. By July, Sri Lanka had received 10.7 million doses of the vaccine. In June, local studies in the country showed vaccination with the Sinopharm BIBP vaccine generated seroconversion and antibody responses in individuals to Delta and Beta variants similar to antibody levels seen following a natural infection

Phase three
With vaccination of persons above 30 years reaching completion, vaccination of those between 18 and 30 years who did not fall under special categories were started in early September 2021.

Proposed vaccine production
On 27 May State Minister for Pharmaceuticals Channa Jayasumana told reporters Sri Lanka was considering co-production of CoronaVac. It was not clarified if it would handle full production or a fill and finish plant.

Vaccination programme

Vaccines used 
Currently, the vaccines approved by government of Sri Lanka for emergency use are:

Vaccine distribution
Vaccine types were deployed on a geographical and group basis:

Special groups
 Medical professionals and front line workers: Oxford–AstraZeneca
 Students travelling overseas for studies: Pfizer–BioNTech
 Migrant workers travelling overseas for work: Pfizer–BioNTech
 Fishermen in Mannar: Pfizer–BioNTech

Geographical
 Western province: Oxford–AstraZeneca, Sinopharm BIBP
 Central province: Sputnik V, Moderna
 Southern province: Oxford–AstraZeneca, Sinopharm BIBP
 North Western province: Oxford–AstraZeneca, Sinopharm BIBP
 Northern province: Sinopharm BIBP
 Eastern province: Sinopharm BIBP
 Sabaragamuwa province: Sinopharm BIBP
 Uva province: Sinopharm BIBP
 North central province: Sinopharm BIBP

Vaccine on order

References 

Sri Lanka
vaccination